The 1952 United States presidential election in Kansas took place on November 4, 1952, as part of the 1952 United States presidential election. Voters chose eight representatives, or electors, to the Electoral College, who voted for president and vice president.

Kansas was won by Columbia University President Dwight D. Eisenhower (R–New York), running with Senator Richard Nixon, with 68.77% of the popular vote, against Adlai Stevenson (D–Illinois), running with Senator John Sparkman, with 30.50% of the popular vote.

Kansas is reliably Republican, with the party's nominee losing the state only three times since 1920. That fact, combined with Eisenhower's boyhood home of Abilene, the seat of Dickinson County, made the results from the Sunflower State among the least surprising of the 1952 election.

With 68.77% of the popular vote, Kansas would prove to be Eisenhower's fifth strongest state after Vermont, North Dakota, South Dakota and Nebraska.

Results

Results by county

See also
 United States presidential elections in Kansas

References

Kansas
1952
1952 Kansas elections